Jiangxi University of Technology (JXUT) is a private nonprofit university located in Nanchang, Jiangxi, China which was founded in 1994 and renamed from Jiangxi Blue Sky University in 2012. Jiangxi University of Technology has been ranked number 1 in private universities in China by the Network of Science and Education Evaluation in China since 2007.

Campus

The campus is located in Yaohu University Zone of Nanchang City, adjacent to the campus of Jiangxi Normal University. On campus there are canteens, banks, clinic, library, shopping center, gymnasium, stadium, theater, and accommodations.

Programs
JXUT offers 35 undergraduate programs and 40 vocational programs.

Students, faculty and staff
There are about 38,000 students and 3,000 faculty and staff on the campus, 100,000 alumni around the world. During the past five years, JXUT has ever hired 62 foreign teachers in total.

Facilities and resources
JXUT focuses on practical skills and professional relevance. There are 17 practical training centers, including Vehicle Technology Center, Mechanic Foundational Experiment Center, Computer Technology Laboratory, Modern Production Technology Center, Clothing Design and Fabrication Center, Artistic Design and Implementation Center, Software and Internet Technology Center, Practical Nursing Center, Music and Dance Stadium, Basic Electrical Experiment Laboratory, Civil Engineering Center, Electrical Technology Center, Management Demonstration Center, Dynamic Laboratory, Basic Science Laboratory, Language Practice Center, and Physical Training Stadium.

See also
List of universities in China
List of universities and colleges in Jiangxi

References

External links 
Jiangxi University of Technology Official Website

Education in Jiangxi
Universities and colleges in Jiangxi
Universities in Nanchang